Giovanni Manson Ribeiro (born 31 January 2002), simply known as Giovanni, is a Brazilian footballer who plays as an attacking midfielder for Brazilian club Fluminense.

Club career

Early career
Born in Bauru, São Paulo, Giovanni joined Santos FC's youth setup in 2012, aged ten. After failing to agree on terms to a new contract, he left the club in May 2019, as his youth deal expired, and was subsequently linked to moves to Chelsea and AFC Ajax.

Ajax
On 25 February 2020, Ajax requested FIFA to intervene for the club on the transfer of Giovanni, who was at the time blocked by Santos. On 4 March, after being given the clearance, he was announced by the club on a four-year contract, being initially assigned to the reserve team.

Giovanni made his senior debut for Jong Ajax on 30 August 2020, starting in a 4–0 away loss against Roda JC. On 11 September he scored his first senior goal, netting his team's only in a 2–1 loss at NEC Nijmegen.

Loan to Telstar
On 18 January 2022, Giovanni was loaned out to Telstar until the end of the season. Coincidentally, he made his debut for the club against Jong Ajax on 23 January in a 1–0 home win.

Fluminense
On 2 January 2023, Giovanni signed with Fluminense for the 2023 season, with an option to extend for 2024.

Career statistics

Notes

References

External links
Ajax profile 

2002 births
People from Bauru
Footballers from São Paulo (state)
Living people
Brazilian footballers
Brazil youth international footballers
Association football midfielders
Santos FC players
Eerste Divisie players
Jong Ajax players
AFC Ajax players
SC Telstar players
Fluminense FC players
Brazilian expatriate footballers
Brazilian expatriate sportspeople in the Netherlands
Expatriate footballers in the Netherlands